Behind the Clouds the Sun Is Shining is a 1925 Dutch silent documentary film directed by Willy Mullens.

Cast
 B. A. Huijsers - Meneer Van den Heuvel
 Mevrouw Huijsers - Zijn vrouw
 Mientje Mullens - Annetje
 J. Nijland - Welzijnswerkster

External links 
 

Dutch silent feature films
1925 films
Dutch black-and-white films
Dutch documentary films
Black-and-white documentary films
1925 documentary films